Lake DuBay is a reservoir on the Wisconsin River in Marathon and Portage Counties in the U.S. state of Wisconsin. A dam on the lake is used to generate hydroelectric power. The community of Knowlton is located on the shore of the lake, as are 122 homes and three parks. Interstate 39 and U.S. Route 51 provide access to the lake, as do several county highways. While the lake is frozen in winter, it is used for ice racing by the "Winter Thunder Club".

See also
John Baptiste DuBay

References

External links
Dubay Property Owners Association

Reservoirs in Wisconsin
Bodies of water of Marathon County, Wisconsin
Bodies of water of Portage County, Wisconsin